Raisel Iglesias (born January 4, 1990) is a Cuban professional baseball pitcher for the Atlanta Braves  of Major League Baseball (MLB). In 2014, Iglesias signed with the Cincinnati Reds. He previously played in MLB for the Reds and Los Angeles Angels.

Career

Cuban career
Iglesias played for the Piratas de Isla de la Juventud in the Cuban National Series, and played for the Cuban national baseball team, appearing in the 2013 World Baseball Classic and 2013 World Port Tournament.

In September 2013, Iglesias attempted to defect from Cuba. He hid in the mountains of Isla de la Juventud, but was caught and was detained. In November of that same year, Iglesias successfully defected from Cuba. He established his residency in Haiti, held an open tryout in Mexico in December 2013.

Cincinnati Reds
On June 27, 2014, Iglesias signed with the Cincinnati Reds, to a seven-year contract worth $27 million. The Reds formally added him to their 40-man roster when he arrived in the United States on August 12.

In spring training in 2015, the Reds evaluated Iglesias as a starting pitcher. He started the season in the Reds' Opening Day starting rotation, and made his MLB debut on April 12. He had a couple of stints on the disabled list, limiting him to just 18 games, 16 of them starts. His record was 3–7 with 104 strikeouts. The following season, after beginning the season in the rotation, Iglesias was moved to the bullpen. Iglesias served as setup man and closer for the Reds, finishing with six saves in 37 games. In 2019, Iglesias started the season as the Reds closer and ended the year with career-highs in saves (34) and appearances (68) and a 4.16 ERA. On August 8, 2020, Iglesias earned his 100th MLB career save against the Brewers. In 2020, Iglesias pitched to a 4-3 record and 2.74 ERA with 31 strikeouts in 23.0 innings of work.

Los Angeles Angels
On December 7, 2020, Iglesias was traded to the Angels for Noé Ramirez and Leo Rivas. With the Angels, Iglesias was named American League Reliever of the Month for July 2021. Iglesias finished the 2021 season with a 2.57 ERA, 103 strikeouts and 34 saves. The 34 saves tied his career high and he came up one strikeout short of tying his career high at 104.

On December 1, 2021, Iglesias re-signed with the Angels on a four-year, $58 million contract.

On June 26, 2022, after the brawl between the Angels and the Seattle Mariners, Iglesias threw a tub of sunflower seeds and a bucket of gum onto the infield. This was also the first ejection of his career.

Atlanta Braves
The Angels traded Iglesias to the Atlanta Braves for Jesse Chavez and Tucker Davidson on August 2, 2022.

Personal life
Iglesias had a son during the 2018 season.

References

External links

1990 births
Living people
Atlanta Braves players
Cincinnati Reds players
Defecting Cuban baseball players
Louisville Bats players
Los Angeles Angels players
Major League Baseball pitchers
Major League Baseball players from Cuba
Cuban expatriate baseball players in the United States
National baseball team players
People from Isla de la Juventud
Surprise Saguaros players
Toronjeros de Isla de la Juventud players
2013 World Baseball Classic players